Caledonia Investments plc is an investment trust company based in London, England. It is listed on the London Stock Exchange and is a constituent of the FTSE 250 Index.

History
The company which became Caledonia Investments was incorporated in 1928 as the Foreign Railways Investment Trust Ltd. It was acquired by the Cayzer family in 1951 to hold their diverse interests and was renamed Caledonia Investments Ltd. In 1955 Caledonia acquired the Cayzer family's interest in the British & Commonwealth Shipping Co. Ltd, formed out of the merger of Clan Line (started by the Cayzer family in 1881) and Union-Castle Line. In 1960 the company was listed on the London Stock Exchange and in 1981 their name was changed to Caledonia Investments PLC. After their holding in British & Commonwealth was sold in 1987, Caledonia Investments became a diversified trading and investment company, which in turn was converted into a UK Investment trust company on 1 April 2003. The Cayzer family collectively owns some 48.5% of the share capital of Caledonia Investments plc.

Operations
Caledonia is a self-managed investment trust. It takes significant holdings in listed equities, private companies and funds. Taking a long term investment approach, Caledonia Investments is a value investor with a global outlook. David Stewart is the chairman and Will Wyatt the chief executive.

References

External links 
 Company website

Investment trusts of the United Kingdom
Companies based in the City of Westminster
Companies listed on the London Stock Exchange